William Bryars (1858 – 3 November 1892) was a New Zealand cricketer. He played in one first-class match for Canterbury in 1887/88.

See also
 List of Canterbury representative cricketers

References

External links
 

1858 births
1892 deaths
New Zealand cricketers
Canterbury cricketers
Cricketers from Belfast